Albert Bates Lord (15 September 1912 – 29 July 1991) was a professor of Slavic and comparative literature at Harvard University who, after the death of his mentor Milman Parry, carried on Parry's research on epic poetry.

Early life
Lord was born in Boston, Massachusetts. He graduated from Boston Latin School in 1930 and attended Harvard College, where he received an A.B. in classics in 1934 and a Ph.D. in comparative literature in 1949.

Career
Lord became a professor of Slavic and comparative literature at Harvard in 1950. He was later promoted as a full professor there in Classics. He also founded Harvard's Committee on Degrees in Folklore and Mythology, and chaired the college's Department of Folklore and Mythology until his retirement in 1983.

Lord authored the book The Singer of Tales, first published in 1960. It was reissued in a 40th anniversary edition, with an audio compact disc to aid in the understanding of the recorded renditions discussed in the text. His wife Mary Louise Lord completed and edited his manuscript of a posthumous sequel The Singer Resumes the Tale (published 1995) which further supports and extends Lord's initial conclusions.

Lord demonstrated the ways in which various great ancient epics from Europe and Asia were heirs to a tradition not only of oral performance, but of oral composition. He argued strongly for a complete divide between the non-literate authors of the Homeric epics and the scribes who later wrote them down, positing that the texts that have been preserved are a transcription by a listener of a single telling of the story. The story itself has no definitive text, but consists of innumerable variants, each improvised by the teller in the act of telling the tale from a mental stockpile of verbal formulas, thematic constructs, and narrative incidents. This improvisation is for the most part unconscious; epic tellers believe that they are faithfully recounting the story as it was handed down to them, even though the actual text of their tellings will differ substantially from day to day and from teller to teller.

Lord studied and made field recordings of Serbian heroic epics sung to the gusle, most notable of poets he worked with was Avdo Međedović. He studied not only Homeric epics, but also Beowulf, Gilgamesh, The Song of Roland, and the Anglo-Scottish Child Ballads. Across these many story traditions he found strong commonalities concerning the oral composition of traditional storytelling.

Personal life
His wife, Mary Louise Lord née Carlson, taught classics at Connecticut College; they had two children. Lord died in July 1991 at Cambridge, Massachusetts.

Awards and distinctions
1940 - Junior Fellow - Harvard Society of Fellows
1949 - Awarded a Guggenheim Fellowship
1956 - Fellow - American Academy of Arts and Sciences
1959 - Honorary Curator - Milman Parry Collection - Widener Library - Harvard College
1969 - Fellow - American Folklore Society
1972 - Becomes the Arthur Kingsley Porter Professor of Slavic and Comparative Literature - Harvard University
1988 - Recipient of the Yugoslav Star - Yugoslav Consulate
1990 - Awarded an honorary doctorate from the University of Novi Sad

Bibliography

By Lord 
 Albert B. Lord, Bela Bartok, Serbo-Croatian Folk Songs (New York, 1951)
 Albert B. Lord, Serbo-Croatian Heroic Songs, vols. 1 & 2 (Cambridge & Belgrade, 1953–4), vols. 3 & 4, with David E. Bynum (1975)
 Albert B. Lord, Beginning Serbocroatian (The Hague: Mouton & Co., 1958)
 Albert B. Lord, The Singer of Tales (Cambridge, MA: Harvard Univ. Press, 1960)
 Albert B. Lord, Umbundu: Folk Tales from Angola (Boston, 1962)
 Albert B. Lord, David E. Bynum, Beginning Bulgarian (The Hague, 1962)
 Albert B. Lord, A Bulgarian Literary Reader (Cambridge, 1962)
 Albert B. Lord, The Wedding of Smailagic Meho (Cambridge, 1974)
 Albert B. Lord, Bela Bartók, ed. Benjamin Suchoff, Yugoslav Folk Music (Albany, NY, 1978)
 Albert B. Lord, Serbo-Croatian Folk Songs and Instrumental Pieces from the Milman Parry Collection (Albany, NY, 1978)
 Albert B. Lord, ed. John Miles Foley Festschrift: Oral Traditional Literature: A Festschrift for Albert Bates Lord, (Columbus, OH, 1981)
 Albert B. Lord, "Perspectives on Recent Work on the Oral Traditional Formula," in Oral Tradition, vol. 1, no. 3 (1986), pp. 467–503
 Albert B. Lord, "Characteristics of Orality," in A Festschrift for Walter J. Ong, S.J., a special issue of Oral Tradition, vol. 2, no. 1 (1987), pp. 54–72
 Albert B. Lord, Epic Singers and Oral Tradition (Ithaca, NY: Cornell Univ. Press, 1991)
 Albert B. Lord, "Oral Composition and 'Oral Residue' in the Middle Ages", in Oral Tradition in the Middle Ages, ed. W. F. H. Nicolaisen (Binghamton, NY: Medieval & Renaissance Texts & Studies, 1995), pp. 7–29

On Lord
 John Miles Foley, "Albert Bates Lord (1912-1991): An Obituary," in Journal of American Folklore 105 (1992), pp. 57–65. 
 "Albert Bates Lord, 78, Scholar of Folk Tales," New York Times, August 3, 1991.
 Morgan E. Grey, Mary Louise Lord, and John Miles Foley, "A Bibliography of Publications by Albert Bates Lord," in Oral Tradition, vol. 25, no. 2 (2010), pp. 497–504.

Works cited

External links
 
Albert and Mary Louise Lord Collection at the University of Missouri Libraries

1912 births
1991 deaths
American folklorists
Epic poetry collectors
Harvard University alumni
Harvard University faculty
Scholars of epic poetry